Esophageal webs are thin membranes occurring anywhere along the esophagus.

Presentation
Its main symptoms are pain and difficulty in swallowing (dysphagia).

Esophageal webs are thin  membranes of normal esophageal tissue consisting of mucosa and submucosa that can partially protrude/obstruct the esophagus. They can be congenital or acquired. Congenital webs commonly appear in the middle and inferior third of the esophagus, and they are more likely to be circumferential with a central or eccentric orifice. Acquired webs are much more common than congenital webs and typically appear in the cervical area (postcricoid).

Clinical symptoms of this condition are selective (solid more than liquids) dysphagia, thoracic pain, nasopharyngeal reflux, aspiration, perforation and food impaction (the last two are very rare).

Causes
They are mainly observed in the Plummer–Vinson syndrome, which is associated with chronic iron deficiency anemia. One in 10 patients with Plummer-Vinson syndrome will eventually develop squamous cell carcinoma of the esophagus, but it is unclear if esophageal webs in and of themselves are a risk factor.

Esophageal webs are associated with bullous diseases (such as epidermolysis bullosa, pemphigus, and bullous pemphigoid), with graft versus host disease involving the esophagus, and with celiac disease.

Esophageal webs are more common in white individuals and in women (with a ratio of 2:1). The literature describes relations between these webs and Plummer-Vinson Syndrome, bullous dermatologic disorders, inlet patch, graft-versus-host disease and celiac disease. The postulated mechanisms are sideropenic anemia (mechanism unknown) or some interference of the immune system.
Esophageal webs can be ruptured during upper endoscopy.

Diagnosis
The diagnostic test of choice is a barium swallow.

Treatment
Esophageal webs and rings can be treated with endoscopic dilation.

References

External links 

Esophagus disorders
Congenital disorders of digestive system